The Pennsylvania Liquor Control Board (PLCB) is an independent government agency that manages the beverage alcohol industry in Pennsylvania by administering the Pennsylvania Liquor Code. It is responsible for licensing the possession, sale, storage, transportation, importation and manufacture of wine, spirits and malt or brewed beverages in the commonwealth, as well as operating a system of liquor distribution (retailing) and providing education about the harmful effects of underage and dangerous drinking.

Summary
The Pennsylvania Liquor Control Board was established in conjunction with the 21st Amendment and the repeal of prohibition. In 1933, just four days before the sale of alcohol became legal in Pennsylvania, the Board was officially organized. Governor Gifford Pinchot is often inaccurately quoted as having stated that the purpose of the Board was to "discourage the purchase of alcoholic beverages by making it as inconvenient and expensive as possible," (probably because of the quote's former misattribution on this very page), while in reality he believed that state control was the best way to move forward from Prohibition.

The agency has its headquarters in the Northwest Office Building in Harrisburg.

On-premises retail licenses and off-premises wholesale licenses are apportioned through a quota system (see below) established by the Pennsylvania Liquor Code. Under the law, the PLCB may grant one retail license for every 3,000 inhabitants of a county and one wholesale license for every 30,000 inhabitants of a county (with a minimum of five wholesale licenses allowed per county). To prevent a municipality from being inundated by liquor licenses, the Pennsylvania Liquor Code also established a population-based municipal quota that limits the number of retail liquor licenses allowed in a municipality; the issuance or transfer of any additional licenses beyond that quota requires prior municipal approval.

As of November 2016, there were about 20,000 active liquor licenses in Pennsylvania. Restaurants and food operations that are licensed to serve or sell drinks in Pennsylvania must purchase their liquor from the PLCB, which operates more than 600 Fine Wine & Good Spirits stores (originally branded simply as a "State Store," then "PA Wine & Spirits" stores before a rebranding project started in 2010) statewide and an e-commerce site. If a wine or spirit is not on the list of registered brands, then it cannot be bought or sold in Pennsylvania.

In Fiscal Year 2015–16, sales at Fine Wine & Good Spirits stores generated more than $2.43 billion in sales and taxes. Taxes and store profits are returned to Pennsylvania’s General Fund; more than $626.3 million was returned to the Pennsylvania Treasury, funded state programs or was returned to local communities in FY2015-16. In the last five fiscal years (FY2011-12 through FY2015-16), the PLCB provided more than $2.66 billion to the Pennsylvania Treasury, $122.5 million to the Pennsylvania State Police, $12.1 million to the Department of Drug and Alcohol Programs, and $22.5 million to local communities. Since its inception, the PLCB has contributed more than $15.1 billion to the Pennsylvania Treasury.

The Board also supervises local option referendums in counties and municipalities that wish to prohibit or permit establishments to sell or serve alcohol. According to Section 472 of the Pennsylvania Liquor Code, a local option referendum to change what alcohol sales a municipality allows or prohibits may be voted on during any election. The issue may not be voted on more than once in four years. A referendum can be broad – for example, allowing all forms of alcohol sales in a municipality – or it can be very narrow, for example, allowing only a specific golf course to sell alcohol. To place a referendum on the ballot requires a petition with a number of signatures equal to at least 25 percent of the highest vote cast for any office in that municipality in the preceding general election. As of August 2017, almost 700 Pennsylvania municipalities are "dry" or "partially dry."

Unlike other Pennsylvania administrative agencies, appeals from decisions of the Board are to the local Pennsylvania Court of Common Pleas, rather than directly to the Commonwealth Court of Pennsylvania.

As a result of Act 14 (enacted June 30, 1987), enforcement of the Pennsylvania Liquor Code was transferred from the PLCB to the Pennsylvania State Police Bureau of Liquor Control Enforcement (BLCE). This function is fully funded by the PLCB out of operational revenues.

Board members
The Board itself is composed of three members who are appointed by the governor and confirmed by a two-thirds vote of the Pennsylvania State Senate. They are appointed to staggered four-year terms ending the third Tuesday in May, but members may serve up to six months beyond that date.
Current Board members are:
 Tim Holden of St. Clair, Schuylkill County – Chairman
Former Congressman Tim Holden (D) was nominated to the Board by Gov. Tom Corbett, on June 14, 2013. He was unanimously confirmed by the State Senate on Nov. 13, 2013, and sworn in a day later. Holden was named chairman of the PLCB by Gov. Tom Wolf on Feb. 17, 2015. He was unanimously confirmed for a second term by the state Senate on June 29, 2016, and sworn in on July 11, 2016. He was nominated to serve a third term by Governor Wolf on May 21, 2020, and was unanimously confirmed by the state Senate on Oct. 21, 2020. Tim Holden was the Skuylkill County Sheriff from 1985-1992. Then served as a member of Congress, serving Pennsylvania's Sixth District from 1993-2002 and then the 17th District from 2003 to 2012. Holden was also a member of the House Agriculture Committee. 
 Mike Negra of Centre Hall, Centre County
Mike Negra (R) was nominated to the Board by Gov. Tom Corbett on Sept. 10, 2014, and was unanimously confirmed by the state Senate on Oct. 16, 2014. He was sworn in on Oct. 21, 2014.
 Mary Isenhour of Harrisburg, Dauphin County
Mary Isenhour (D) was nominated by Gov. Tom Wolf on February 15, 2019, and confirmed by the state Senate on June 19, 2019. She is the first woman to serve on the PLCB. Before joining the Board, Isenhour was Secretary of Legislative Affairs and Chief of Staff to Tom Wolf.

Programs to deter underage drinking
The PLCB Bureau of Alcohol Education provides educational material to youth, legal consumers and beverage alcohol servers. This includes RAMP (Responsible Alcohol Management Program), which is directed at establishments selling alcoholic beverages.

The PLCB policy of "zero tolerance" for sales to minors and intoxicated individuals has resulted in store employees challenging, or "carding," those who appear to be underage. Store employees can also require a customer to fill out a form attesting to his/her age before the sale is completed. This policy and effective implementation are considered to be an excellent deterrent to underage drinking in Pennsylvania. According to the PLCB Fiscal Year 2014–15 Annual Report, Fine Wine & Good Spirits store employees conducted more than 1.3 million ID checks during the 2014 calendar year.

The Bureau of Alcohol Education annually awards approximately $1 million in grants to reduce underage and dangerous drinking to colleges and universities, community organizations, law enforcement departments, and high schools. Those same groups send representatives to an annual Alcohol Education conference for prevention professionals in Pennsylvania. Another annual event is the Alcohol Awareness Poster Contest for students in kindergarten through 12th grade.

The quota system
The quota on retail liquor licenses is set forth in Section 461(a) of the Pennsylvania Liquor Code. While that section lays out exceptions, generally, Restaurant Liquor (R), Eating Place Malt Beverage (E), Club (C) and Catering Club Liquor (CC) licenses are subject to the quota. Quota exceptions include ski resorts and casinos. Hotel (H), Off-Track Wagering Restaurant Liquor (OWR), Airport Restaurant (AR), Golf Course (PGR, PGC, GCC, PGE), Continuing Care Retirement (CRR, CRE), Economic Development (EDR, EDE), Performing Arts (PAF) and Public Venue Restaurant (PV) licenses are not subject to the quota.

The first retail license quota was established by Act 358 of 1939, which set it at 1 license for every 1,000 municipal inhabitants. That was changed to 1 license for every 1,500 inhabitants by Act 702 of 1951; 1 license for every 2,000 inhabitants by Act 108 of 1972; and 1 license for every 3,000 inhabitants by Act 160 of 1990. The quota system was switched to a county-based system by Act 141 of 2000.

Section 437(f) of the Pennsylvania Liquor Code establishes quotas for Malt Beverage Distributors (D) and Malt Beverage Importing Distributors (ID). One D or ID license is issued for every 30,000 residents, with a minimum of five available in each county. There are no exceptions. Act 591 of 1952 established the distributor license quota at 1 license for every 10,000 county inhabitants and a minimum of five per county. Act 445 of 1965 changed the quota to 1 license for every 15,000 county inhabitants; Act 160 of 1990 made it 1 license for every 30,000 county inhabitants.

Board members and their terms of service

Efforts to privatize

For over forty years, starting with the administration of Governor Milton Shapp, efforts have existed to abolish the Board and privatize liquor sales in Pennsylvania. Critics of the Board argue that the commonwealth would generate significant income by selling state liquor stores to private entities while continuing to reap millions in annual sales taxes from alcohol sales and liquor tax revenues. Further, it has been cited that customers could benefit from lower prices, longer hours and wider selection at privately run liquor stores. In addition, privatizing liquor sales would allow the commonwealth to recoup taxes from sales in neighboring states such as New Jersey, Ohio and Delaware.  Despite these arguments, efforts to privatize have largely stalled.  According to former governor Dick Thornburgh, "the principal roadblock to reform has traditionally been an odd coalition of state store employee unions, fundamentalist anti-alcohol groups and organizations such as Mothers Against Drunk Driving, all of which perceive that they have legitimate interests which are not susceptible to statewide budgetary considerations. It would take some courageous leadership to stare down this combination, something I do not see in the commonwealth today." In September 2014, PA House proposed a bill that would decriminalize purchasing wine and liquor in other states and transporting it to the state.

Opponents of privatization argue that keeping the stores public would generate significantly more money over time, as well as keep over 5000 employees from losing their jobs, pensions, and health benefits, many of whom are elderly. Although 45% of the entire LCB workforce is temporary, seasonal or part-time and may not have all the benefits that full time employees have.

On July 2, 2015, Governor Wolf vetoed the first-ever privatization bill to reach the governor's desk.

On August 8, 2016, Governor Wolf signed into law a bill that allowed for some privatization but kept wine distribution under state control.

See also
 List of Pennsylvania state agencies

References

External links 

 Why Did Pennsylvania Become a Liquor Control State?

Alcohol monopolies
State alcohol agencies of the United States
Liquor Control Board
Government agencies established in 1933
1933 establishments in Pennsylvania